Forgotten is a 2013 Bolivian drama film written by Elia Petridis and directed by Carlos Bolado, and is based on the repression and killings associated with the U.S.-backed Operation Condor. It was selected as the Bolivian entry for the Best Foreign Language Film at the 87th Academy Awards, but was not nominated.

Cast
 Damián Alcázar as José Mendieta
 Rafael Ferro as Sanera
 Carla Ortiz as Lucía
 Tomás Fonzi as Antonio
 Ana Celentano as Andrea
 Eduardo Paxeco as Jorge

See also
 List of submissions to the 87th Academy Awards for Best Foreign Language Film
 List of Bolivian submissions for the Academy Award for Best Foreign Language Film

References

External links
 

2013 films
2013 drama films
2010s Spanish-language films
Bolivian drama films
Films directed by Carlos Bolado
Films about Latin American military dictatorships